Otto Bahr Halvorsen (28 May 1872 – 23 May 1923) was a Norwegian lawyer and politician from the Conservative Party, who served as the 14th prime minister of Norway from 1920 to 1921 and again in 1923 up until his death in office.

Background
Halvorsen was born in Kristiania (now Oslo, Norway) to  Otto Hellen Halvorsen (1840-1921) and Karine Christine Christiansen (1847-1927). He attended Kristiania Cathedral School. He studied law  at the University of Kristiania where he completed his examen artium in 1890. As a licensed attorney, in 1904 he opened  a law firm in Kristiania.

Political career
In 1912 Halvorsen was first elected to the Storting from the neighborhood of Gamle Aker in the district of St. Hanshaugen in Kristiania. 
Halvorsen served  Kristiania in the Parliament from the Conservative Party from 1913 to 1923. He became Prime Minister during 1920 while also serving as Minister of Justice. He again became Prime Minister in May 1923 while simultaneously serving as Minister of Justice. Between these terms,  Halvorsen was leader of the Conservative Party in Parliament and President of the Storting (stortingspresident).

Personal life
In 1899, he was married to Kathrine Hofgaard (1875-1960), daughter of Simon Wright Hofgaard and Ida Mathilde Aars.

References

External links
Otto B. Halvorsen's First Government 
Otto B. Halvorsen's Second Government

1872 births
1923 deaths
Lawyers from Oslo
People educated at Oslo Cathedral School
University of Oslo alumni
Politicians from Oslo
Leaders of the Conservative Party (Norway)
Presidents of the Storting
Members of the Storting
Prime Ministers of Norway
Order of the Dannebrog
Recipients of the St. Olav's Medal
Burials at Vestre gravlund
Ministers of Justice of Norway